My Spy Family is a British live action family comedy series created by Paul Alexander. The series is a co-production between Kindle Entertainment and Turner Broadcasting System Europe with Decode Enterprises handling distribution. The series aired on: Cartoon Network and Boomerang in UK, TG4 in Ireland, Panda Biggs in Portugal, and Cartoon Network in France, Denmark, Finland, Hungary, Iceland, Italy, Poland, Romania, and South Africa. All the music is written by Glenn Keiles excluding some songs heard in the "Intelligence Agency Cafe", these have been co-written with other songwriters.

Plot synopsis

The show is about the Bannon family, who all have strong spy links.  The parents, Dirk and Talia, were once arch enemy spies, but fell in love and got married.  They now have three children (Spike, Elle and Boris) who have all been brought up with spy techniques as a matter of course. Spike's friend Travis (played by Richard Sargent) is commonly seen on the show.The action is based in three major locations, the Bannon home, the children's school, and the local café, which is run by Des, Dirk's former Personal Ordnance Officer (gadget-master).

Characters

Main characters
 Dirk Bannon (portrayed by Milo Twomey) - Dirk is a British former spy. He is married to his former arch rival, Talia, who also happened to be a spy. Dirk is usually a pushover to his wife and is somewhat more incompetent than she is at being a spy. Together, they have three children: Spike, Elle, and Boris. He is best friends with Des, his former Personal Ordnance Officer (gadget-master). He is rarely seen wearing something other than a tuxedo.
 Talia Bannon (portrayed by Natasha Beaumont) - The Russian arch rival of Dirk, but later fell in love and married him, before retiring. As seen in few episodes, she has better fighting techniques, as well as better spying techniques than her husband. She also tends to add the suffix "-sky" to words she says, such as referring to herself as "Mumsky." She also is a master of disguise. In "The Back in Batley Affair" she introduces herself as Natalia Alexandrina Vladimir Knockemoff-Bannon, after being put in charge of the Intelligence Agency Cafe, after Des, the owner, is written out of series 3.
 Spike Bannon (portrayed by Joe Tracini) - The eldest offspring of Dirk and Talia. Spike is an expert in creating various spy gadgets. Many times, it is shown that he, along with his best friend, Travis, try to sabotage any plans or simply to make fool of his geography teacher, Mr. Vong, with whom he does not get along well, due to the schemes of the Spike.
 Elle Bannon (portrayed by Alice Connor) - Like her mother, she also has very good combat skills and spy techniques. She is often seen hanging out with her friends Donna and Marcy in the school, and is often at odds with her brother Spike. Talia says there is a 7% chance that she is heir to the throne of Russia.
 Boris Bannon (portrayed by Ignat Pakhotin) - The youngest offspring of Dirk and Talia. He is an expert in setting booby traps and hiding. Though he is a member of the family, he is treated as the most unnoticeable character in the show. He is not often shown and rarely speaks, but when he does it is in Russian, which no one seems to understand except Talia. He is written out of series 3 in the opener, "The Back in Batley Affair", which describes him to be ruling Russia as he looks like the former ruler, which makes Talia proud. However, he eventually returns in "The Boris Bounces Back Affair".

Recurring characters
 Des (portrayed by Vas Blackwood) - Des was Dirk's former Personal Ordnance Officer (gadget-master). He has since retired and opened the local Intelligence Agency Cafe, though his kitchen has many various types of gadgets which come useful during spy missions. He is best friends with Dirk, though sometimes that is not the case in few episodes. He has also shown interest in Talia. Like Boris, he is also written out of season 3, who has gone to Bermuda for a year after he is elected honorary president of the World Shark Surfing Federation, putting Talia in charge.
 Travis Mitchell (portrayed by Richard Sargent) - Travis is the best friend of Spike. He is very loyal to Spike and is always willing to help him. The actor who plays the character is a wheelchair user, but the show purposely does not mention his disability in the show. Instead they make fun of him because of his glasses.
 Mr. Ernest Vong (portrayed by Ramon Tikaram) - School's geography teacher who seems to have the most authority. Spike sees Vong as an adversary, who schemes and pranks against him to get what he wants (which always fail), making Wong greatly dislike Spike, although he has no ill feelings to the rest of his family. It is hinted that he is Indian, as there is a map of India in his classroom. In the episode "The Mum's The Word Affair", it is revealed that he lives with his mother, who in turn revealed his first name.
 Donna Jacobs (portrayed by Cascade Brown) - Donna is a close friend of Elle and is mostly seen hanging out with her and Marcy. Donna is obsessed with fashion, boyfriends and wishes to be a model. Talia often comments that she will be unable to be a model nor have boyfriends due to her ankles.
 Marcy Desmond (portrayed by Kirsty Leigh Porter) - Marcy is a shy friend of Elle and is mostly seen hanging out with Elle and Donna. Most of the times it is observed that she is the exact opposite of Donna since she has no fashion sense nor has any boyfriend.
 Mike Quiller (portrayed by Dan Li) - A former MI5 office boy, who Talia hires to help out after Des has left and gone to Bermuda for a year to be honorary president of the World Shark Surfing Federation. Mike is a big fan of Dirk.

Episodes

Season 1 (2007)

Season 2 (2008)

Season 3 (2009–10)

Cast

References

External links
 Virtual 360 tour of the My Spy Family studio
 
 Kindle Entertainment

Boomerang (TV network) original programming
Cartoon Network original programming
British children's comedy television series
2007 British television series debuts
2010 British television series endings
2000s British comedy television series
2010s British comedy television series
Television series by Kindle Entertainment
English-language television shows
Television shows set in West Yorkshire
2000s British children's television series
2010s British children's television series